A tone argument (also called tone policing) is a type of ad hominem aimed at the tone of an argument instead of its factual or logical content. Ignoring the truth or falsity of a statement, a tone argument instead focuses on the emotion with which it is expressed. This is a logical fallacy because a person can be angry while still being rational. Nonetheless, a tone argument may be useful when responding to a statement that itself does not have rational content, such as an appeal to emotion.

The notion of tone policing became widespread in U.S. social activist circles by the mid-2010s. It was widely disseminated in a 2015 comic issued by the Everyday Feminism website. Many activists argued that tone policing was regularly employed against feminist and anti-racism advocates, criticizing the way that they presented their arguments rather than engaging with the arguments themselves.

See also
 Fallacy
 Righteous indignation

References

Diversionary tactics
Relevance fallacies
Metaphors